Julio Murat (born on 18 August 1961 in Izmir, Turkey) is a Turkish prelate of the Catholic Church who works in the diplomatic service of the Holy See.

Biography

Julio Murat began his preparation for the priesthood in Rome, where on 25 May 1986 he was ordained a priest by the hands of Pope John Paul II in St. Peter's Basilica in the Vatican and was incardinated into the Archdiocese of Izmir. After his ordination he continued his education studying canon law at the Pontifical Urban University. In 1991 Murat concluded his law studies, with his doctoral dissertation "I diritti soggettivi della buona fama e dell'intimita codificati nel Canone 220". In 1992 he graduated himself to the preparation for diplomatic service at the Pontifical Ecclesiastical Academy, and from 1 January 1994 he began working in the Vatican diplomatic missions. Successively, Murat worked in Indonesia, Pakistan, Belarus, Austria, and from January 2003 at the Section for Relations with States of the Secretariat of State of the Holy See.

On 27 January 2012 he was appointed by Pope Benedict XVI apostolic nuncio in Zambia and titular archbishop of Orange. Murat was ordained bishop on 3 March 2012 in Rome, by Secretary of State Tarcisio Bertone. On 6 June 2012, he was named nuncio to Malawi as well.

On 24 March 2018, Pope Francis named him apostolic nuncio to Cameroon. The responsibilities of Nuncio to Equatorial Guinea were added on 29 March.

On 9 November 2022, Pope Francis named him apostolic nuncio to Sweden and Iceland. 

On 25 January 2023, Pope Francis named him apostolic nuncio to Denmark as well.

On 7 March 2023, Pope Francis named him apostolic nuncio to Finland as well.

On 16 March 2023, Pope Francis named him apostolic nuncio to Norway as well

See also
 List of heads of the diplomatic missions of the Holy See

References

External links
 http://www.catholic-hierarchy.org/bishop/bmurat.html 
 http://www.gcatholic.org/dioceses/nunciature/nunc104.htm#47702 

1961 births
21st-century Roman Catholic titular archbishops
Living people
Apostolic Nuncios to Zambia
Apostolic Nuncios to Malawi
Apostolic Nuncios to Cameroon
Apostolic Nuncios to Equatorial Guinea
Apostolic Nuncios to Iceland
Apostolic Nuncios to Sweden
Turkish Roman Catholic archbishops